Laws of rugby may refer to:

 Laws of rugby league
 Laws of rugby union